Surasak station is a BTS skytrain station, on the Silom Line in Bang Rak and Sathon districts, Bangkok, Thailand. The station is located on Sathon Road to the east of Sathon-Surasak intersection. The surrounding area along Sathon Road is primarily a business zone with many office towers and embassies. Holiday Inn Bangkok Silom is a 5-mins walk, Bangkok Christian College and Saint Louis Churchpatrick are within walking distance to the east of the station.

Incident
On the evening of 20 August 2022, a person slipped and fell backwards on the ascending escalator at Exit 3 causing commuters behind to tumble on top of each other, resulting in 28 injuries. The event occurred as concert-goers were returning home under heavy rain, from a concert held at the nearby Bangkok Christian College in commemoration of the school's 170th year.

See also
 Bangkok Skytrain

References

BTS Skytrain stations